Coccophagus acanthosceles is a species of  chalcid wasp belonging to the family Aphelinidae. It is found in southern Asia.

It is a primary parasitoid on scale insects of the family Coccidae including Saissetia formicarii and members of the genus Lecanium.

References
Universal Chalcidoidea Database

Aphelinidae
Hymenoptera of Asia
Insects described in 1916